McKinley Mall, which opened on October 7, 1985, is a shopping mall in Buffalo, New York, United States. The mall is located in Buffalo, New York at the intersection of McKinley Parkway and Milestrip Road (New York State Route 179) immediately east of Interstate 90 and the New York State Thruway. McKinley Mall services the Southtowns of Erie County, New York.

The mall currently maintains the traditional chains Bed Bath & Beyond, Best Buy, Old Navy, Barnes & Noble, and JCPenney.

History
The McKinley Mall opened on October 7, 1985, in Blasdell, NY, just south of Buffalo. At the time of opening the mall featured approximately 80 inline stores, including a food court known as "The Garden." It also featured anchors of the time: AM&A's, The Sample, and Sears. In 1986, a six screen General Cinema Theatre opened. The construction of the mall in the early 1980s brought a wave of controversy throughout the adjoining town of Hamburg, as the town was divided over whether or not the mall should be built.  At the time the site was largely undeveloped but has now become largely developed. 

Monday, August 15, 1988, local chain L. L. Berger added on to the mall opening a  store. On Thursday, April 6, 1989, the mall saw Sibley's add on to the mall, relocating from the Seneca Mall. 1989 also saw the opening of the Walden Galleria 10 miles north in Cheektowaga. A super-regional mall, the Galleria helped accelerate the death of many aging surrounding malls including the Seneca Mall, and the Thruway Mall. However, the Mckinley Mall continued on almost unfettered, as it served the Southtowns of Western New York. 1991 saw JCPenney add on to the mall which relocated from the Seneca Mall in West Seneca, which was three miles away. 1990 also saw the conversion of Sibley's into Pittsburgh based Kaufmann's and in 1991, the entire L. L. Berger chain closed after filing for Chapter 11 Bankruptcy and became Kaufmann's Home Store.

Throughout the 1990s, the presence and success of the McKinley Mall brought enormous growth in peripheral retail surrounding the property. Surrounding the mall within the property included the opening of stores such as Circuit City, Pier 1, Media Play, Dollar Tree, and Rosa's Home and Furniture Store. Likewise, many restaurants opened surrounding the property including Olive Garden, Red Lobster, and TGI Fridays. Outside the mall on McKinley Parkway and Milestrip Road, stores such as Home Depot, BJ's Wholesale Club, Toys "R" Us, Jo-Ann Fabrics, OfficeMax, A.C. Moore, TJ Maxx, Wegmans, and Aldi opened. Restaurants that opened outside the mall included Ruby Tuesday, Applebee's, Friendly's, and Outback Steakhouse. 1994 brought the opening of York, Pennsylvania based The Bon-Ton after they purchased Buffalo based AM&A's the same year.

In 2006 it was announced that Bed Bath and Beyond would open a store in the Sears wing on the mall's western side while Best Buy announced they would open a store next door. In September 2006, Pittsburgh based Kaufmann's became Macy's. 2008 saw the opening of Barnes and Noble. 2009 saw the opening of Ulta Beauty and in 2011, Old Navy moved into the mall where KB Toys used to be.

The later 2010's saw multiple traditional chain anchors update their brick-and-mortar fleets after being disrupted by digital retailers in recent years. In April 2016, Macy's, which maintains several much larger outposts around Western New York, announced as part of a strategy to focus on their highest achieving locations that they would be leaving the center. In April 2018, it was announced regional division The Bon-Ton would shutter as a result of bankruptcy. In February, 2020, Sears announced they would shutter as part of an on going plan to phase out of brick-and-mortar.

The onset of the COVID-19 pandemic forced all malls to close in response to prolonged lockdown orders nationwide. During this time most inline stores left the mall with speculation the mall would be retrofitted and with customers commenting that they'd like to see the mall refreshed with new stores. On July 28, 2021, the Kohan Retail Investment Group purchased McKinley Mall for $8.5 million.

See also
 Walden Galleria
 The Summit
 Eastern Hills Mall
 Boulevard Mall
 Shops at West Senaca

References

External links
 McKinley Mall

Shopping malls in New York (state)
Shopping malls established in 1985
Buildings and structures in Erie County, New York
Tourist attractions in Erie County, New York
1985 establishments in New York (state)
Kohan Retail Investment Group